Vajnory Airport  was an airfield located near the village of Vajnory, close to Slovakia's capital Bratislava. It was closed in January 2007.

This area is now served by the Milan Rastislav Štefánik Airport.

See also
 List of airports in Slovakia

References

Defunct airports
Airports in Slovakia
Transport in Bratislava
2007 disestablishments in Slovakia